William A. Withers (1835-1887) was twice the mayor of Cumberland, Maryland, in 1873–74 and 1876–77.  In addition he served on the city council.

Early in his career William Withers ran a successful tanning business with his father, Addison Lewis Withers, Sr. (1804–1890). Later in life, he was in the hardware business. He died of tuberculosis on 14 May 1887.

References

External links
 City of Cumberland, Maryland

1887 deaths
Mayors of Cumberland, Maryland
1835 births
19th-century American politicians
Businesspeople from Cumberland, Maryland